Shankarpura is a village located in Batala Tehsil of Gurdaspur district in Punjab, India.

Geography 

Shankarpura is situated 4 km away from the sub-district headquarters Batala and 39 km away from district headquarters in Gurdaspur. It has a total population of 910 and an area of about 160 hectares. As per 2011 Population Census, Shankarpura is self-governed by a gram panchayat.

Facilities 

The village contains a post office, a dispensary, an elementary school, a senior secondary school, and around 161 houses.

Demographics

Transport

Nearby villages
 Bishniwal 
 Talwandi Bharath 
 Aliwal Araian 
 Bullowal 
 Khokhar 
 Dhadialanatt 
 Ghoga 
 Kotla Baman 
 Marar 
 Raliali Khurd 
 Rali Ali Kalan

References

Villages in Gurdaspur district